Rača is a small settlement east of Domžale in the Upper Carniola region of Slovenia. Rača Creek, a tributary of the Kamnik Bistrica River, runs through the settlement.

References

External links

Rača on Geopedia

Populated places in the Municipality of Domžale